Atomic Puppet is a Canadian-French animated television series created by Jerry Leibowitz and Mark Drop and produced by Mercury Filmworks, Technicolor Animation Productions and Gaumont Animation. The series aired on Teletoon in Canada, on France 4 in France and on Disney XD worldwide.

The series revolves around the adventures of 7th grader Joey Felt and his partner AP, a world-renowned superhero who's been reduced to life as a powerless sock puppet, until he's placed on Joey's hand. Together, they transform into Mega City's newest superhero duo, Atomic Puppet and Nuclear Boy.

Plot
Mega City's superhero Captain Atomic suffers a setback when, as he is shaking hands with 12-year-old fanboy Joey Felt, his disgruntled sidekick Mookie (or Sergeant Subatomic) transforms him into a living sock puppet. The suddenly powerless superhero quickly realizes that the only way he can regain his former powers is to team up with the boy—a dream come true for Joey, but not so much for Captain Atomic. Together, the two form an unlikely and awkward partnership that allows them to become the city's newest superhero duo — Atomic Puppet and Nuclear Boy.

Characters

Main
 Joseph "Joey" Felt/Nuclear Boy (voiced by Eric Bauza) – The main protagonist of the series, a 12-year-old middle-school student and comic book fan. Through a chance turn of events, he develops the ability to combine with his superhero idol and together they form a new hero, Atomic Puppet and Nuclear Boy.
 Captain Atomic/Atomic Puppet/AP (voiced by Eric Bauza) – Captain Atomic was a world-renowned superhero who lived his life being able to handle situations with his brute strength and endless charm. Blinded by success and fame, he's suddenly transformed into a powerless living sock puppet by his jealous sidekick Mookie. Now he goes by the name AP and, due to his massive ego and short temper, struggles with adjusting to his new life as a puppet and the fact that he can only access his former powers when Joey places him on his hand, turning them into Atomic Puppet and Nuclear Boy.

Supporting
 Pauline Bell (voiced by Lisa Norton) – A sassy middle school girl who is Joey's best friend and the only person other than Mookie and the other superheroes that knows of Joey's secret identity. Pauline occasionally covers for Joey when he needs an excuse to become Atomic Puppet and has fought alongside Atomic Puppet if the situation called for it. She has a job at a comic book shop owned by her uncle.
 Philip "Phil" Felt (voiced by Carlos Díaz) – Joey's burly, rugged, no-nonsense father. He's impatient, opinionated and does everything he can to counteract his wife's babying of the kids.
 Vivian Felt (voiced by Kristina Nicoll) – Joey's sweet but overly caring mother. She worries far too much about her children and is always concerned about what kind of trouble they could get into.
 Abigail Felt (voiced by Katie Griffin) – Joey's energetic 8-year-old sister who goes by the nickname "Abs" or "Abbie"
 Bubbles – The family's slow-witted, overweight, and flatulent tabby cat. AP refers to him as Disastro and is convinced that Bubbles is an undercover villain plotting to take down Atomic Puppet from the inside, while Phil completely adores Bubbles, describing him as "the most adorable kitty-kat in the world".
 Rex Bordeaux (voiced by David Huband) – The egotistical host of Mega City news. As the city's #1 newsman, he climbed his way to celebrity status by reporting on the feats of Captain Atomic, but his reputation is in danger of slipping with Captain Atomic's "disappearance".

Antagonists
 Sergeant Subatomic (Mookie) (voiced by Peter Oldring) – The main antagonist of the series. Mookie is Captain Atomic's bitter and envious former sidekick and is responsible for his transformation into a puppet, done in an attempt to replace him as Mega City's protector. While Mookie does have a wide assortment of gadgets to use, by himself, he's nothing more than a glory hound that lives in his mother's basement. He frequently tries to force the citizens of Mega City to accept him as their hero, but his incompetence and lack of superpowers fail to win them over.
 Professor Tite-Gripp (voiced by Rick Miller) – A cunning and ruthless criminal with massive mechanical hands that give him superhuman strength. He was originally Captain Atomic's archenemy and is now Atomic Puppet's most dangerous foe.
 Naughty Kitty (voiced by Heather Bambrick) – A female thief who wears a black cat costume and steals cats. She is a parody of Catwoman.
 Zorp (voiced by Robert Tinkler) – A green-skinned alien invader who intends to capture the citizens of Mega City and eat them. He is often accompanied by a smaller alien of his species known as Flert.
 Mudman (voiced by Robert Tinkler) – A humanoid creature made entirely of mud who can change his shape and possess others by smothering himself over them. He has a cousin named Dirtbag, a large sack-like creature able to breathe blasts of soil who has  also tangled with Joey and AP. 
 Ms. Erlenmeyer/Queen Mindbender (voiced by Kristina Nicoll) – Joey's bitter science teacher who is driven to madness by AP when he attempts to stop her from putting Joey in detention. Afterwards, she marries a mysterious alien and is transformed into a green-skinned telepath named Queen Mindbender.

Heroes
 Justice Alliance – A superhero team that protects the galaxy at large. Prior to his transformation, Captain Atomic was a member, and he has rejoined as Atomic Puppet.
 Commander Cavalier (voiced by Robert Tinkler) – A Superman-like hero with heat vision powers. He is extremely obsessed with his appearance to the point where showing him a mirror will always cause him to stop and admire himself.
 Robo-Ron (voiced by Martin Roach) – A cyborg superhero who only speaks in beatbox and printed messages. Although he possesses a wide range of gadgetry and is incredibly intelligent, he is considered the least powerful member of the alliance.
 Crimson Beacon – A mute superhero with flaming hair, similar to Firestorm. He has the ability to create almost anything, similar to Green Lantern.
 Princess War Tickle (voiced by Kristina Nicoll) – A superheroine similar to Wonder Woman who dwells in a magical castle in the sky. She has an ongoing rivalry with Captain Atomic as she is the only hero who rivals Captain Atomic in power and fame.

Others
 Rudolph Mintenberg (voiced by Scott McCord) – An eccentric billionaire who lives in a hilltop mansion outside of Mega City. He is constantly bored and entertains himself by with a variety of dangerous gadgets and experiments, forcing Joey and AP to step in and save the day.
 Warren Beasley (voiced by Mark Edwards) – A nosy nerd who lives next door to Joey. His hobby is spying on his neighbors and classmates.
 The Mayor (voiced by Kevin Hanchard) – The mayor of Mega City. He often tries to replace Atomic Puppet because he dislikes the collateral damage they cause in their battles against their various foes.

Episodes

Music
Music composed and performed by Amaury Bernier and David Gana of D&A Factory

Broadcast
The first season is designed as 52 11-minute segments with 2 two-part specials. Atomic Puppet have its world premiere on Disney XD in France on March 13, 2016. The series later debuted on Disney XD in the United States on July 18, 2016. The series aired on Teletoon in Canada on September 11, 2016, and ABC ME in Australia. In Latin America, it began airing on Disney XD on October 27, 2016.

Reception
The series was nominated in 2017 for two Annie Awards: Outstanding Achievement in Character Animation in an Animated TV/Broadcast Production and Outstanding Achievement in Storyboarding in an Animated TV/Broadcast Production. It was also nominated for a Reuben Award in the category of Television Animation, alongside The Loud House and The Simpsons, in 2016 by the National Cartoonists Society.

Dawn M. Burkes of The Dallas Morning News spoke positively on the series, calling it "a hoot of a superhero show". She praised its premise as fresh, unique, and entertaining, and its execution as making for a fun, humorous, and interesting take on the "old-school" superhero dynamic of the hero and his young sidekick.

References

External links
 
 
 Page on Gaumont Animation

2010s Canadian animated television series
2016 Canadian television series debuts
2010s French animated television series
2016 French television series debuts
2017 Canadian television series endings
French children's animated action television series
French children's animated adventure television series
French children's animated comic science fiction television series
French children's animated superhero television series
Canadian children's animated action television series
Canadian children's animated adventure television series
Canadian children's animated comic science fiction television series
Canadian children's animated superhero television series
Anime-influenced Western animated television series
Gaumont Animation
Teletoon original programming
Disney XD original programming
Animated television series about children
English-language television shows